"Cat's Eye" is a song by Japanese pop singer-songwriter, Anri. It served as the opening for the anime series of the same name. A new version of the song titled "Cat's Eye (New Take)" was included on Anri's studio album Timely!!, released December 5, 1983. MAX covered and released their version of the song in 2010.

MAX version

"Cat's Eye" is the sole single from Japanese pop group, MAX's album Be MAX. It was released on May 12, 2010 through Avex subsidiary, Sonic Groove. Their version of the song has been given a Eurobeat arrangement, a nod to the group's initial claim to fame. The single is released in two editions, a CD+DVD and an Enhanced CD. The latter includes a digest of a concert filmed on February 27, 2010.

Release and promotion 
Beginning in January, MAX launched a one-night monthly genre themed concert series entitled MAX Monthly Live VIP at Akasaka BLITZ in Tokyo. Media coverage from the event announced that the group was in the midst of recording material for a release in May to coincide with the group's 15th anniversary. In February, the group held a Eurobeat themed concert where they performed "Cat's Eye" for the first time. Online store listings for a new single followed shortly after, but confirmation of "Cat's Eye" as the actually a-side was not confirmed until April 7 by their management company, Vision Factory.

Music video 
A music video for "Cat's Eye" began production on March 23, 2010 over two days in an undisclosed location.

Track list

CD

DVD

References 

2010 singles
MAX (band) songs
Cat's Eye (manga)
1983 songs
Anime songs